The following list includes notable people who were born or have lived in Santa Rosa, California.

Jacob Appelbaum,  journalist, computer security researcher and hacker 
Francis Boggs, actor, writer, and early movie director
Warren Boyd, television producer, drug counselor
Luther Burbank, horticulturalist
Shirlee Busbee, writer
Efren Carrillo, member of Sonoma County Board of Supervisors 
Maria Ygnacia Lopez de Carrillo, original grantee of Rancho Cabeza de Santa Rosa
Chad Channing, drummer for Nirvana
Kim Conley, professional distance runner, two-time olympian in the 5,0000m
Gabe Cramer, baseball pitcher
Robert X. Cringely, technology journalist
Brett Crozier, Commander of the 
Eftekhar Dadehbala, Iranian singer, known by her stage name "Mahasti", deceased
Rebecca De Mornay, film and television actress
Maya DiRado, Olympic swimmer
Garen Drussai, science fiction writer
William Mark Felt, FBI agent and associate director, Watergate informant known as "Deep Throat"
Guy Fieri, celebrity chef
Mendy Fry, drag racer
Paul Gilger, author of the musical Showtune
Jonathan González, Mexican soccer player
Sara Hall, American middle distance runner
Thomas Lake Harris, mystic and prophet
Chris Hayes, musician, member of Huey Lewis and the News
Richard Heinberg, ecological journalist
Frank Herbert, science-fiction writer and author of Dune
Dan Hicks, singer and songwriter
Joseph and William Hunt, founders of Hunt's foods
Brandon Hyde, manager of the Baltimore Orioles
Jenna Johnson, Olympic swimmer
Julian Lage, guitarist and composer
Levi Leipheimer, cyclist and three-time winner of the Tour of California

Julie London, singer and actress
Kevin Kwan Loucks, concert pianist and arts entrepreneur
Ray Luv, rapper, native of the South Park and West 9th districts
Koa Misi, football linebacker
 McKenzie Moore (born 1992), player in the Israeli Basketball Premier League
Alfonso Motagalvan, soccer player
Brandon Morrow, Major League Baseball pitcher
Ernie Nevers, football star
Vicky Nguyen, television reporter
Stephan Pastis, cartoonist of Pearls Before Swine
Jon Provost, film and television actor
Jade Puget, guitarist for the band AFI

Tony Renda, baseball player
Robert L. Ripley, creator and columnist of Ripley's Believe It or Not
Michael Robinson, rabbi and activist for civil/human rights
Jim Ross, professional wrestling commentator and executive
Pete Rugolo, musician
Greg Sarris, author, film producer and screenwriter, professor
Peter Schifrin (born 1958), Olympic fencer and sculptor
Charles M. Schulz, creator and cartoonist of Peanuts
Jussie Smollett, actor and singer
Stephanie St. James, actress, singer, and disease advocate
David Terrell, fighter
Stephen Tomasin, plays for United States national rugby sevens team
Tony Trujillo, skateboarder 
Natalie Wood, film actress; lived in Santa Rosa as a child

References

Santa Rosa, California
Santa Rosa
 
Santa Rosa